Filhas de Eva (English title: A Woman's Fate) is a Brazilian streaming television series created by Adriana Falcão, Jô Abdu, Martha Mendonça and Nelito Fernandes for Globoplay. Directed by Leonardo Nogueira, Felipe Louzada
and Nathalia Ribas, and produced by TV Globo’s production division Estúdios Globo, it premiered on the streaming service on 8 March 2021. It stars Renata Sorrah, Giovanna Antonelli, Vanessa Giácomo, Dan Stulbach, Marcos Veras, Débora Ozório, and Cacá Amaral.

Plot 
The series tells the story of three women who are trapped in standards that do not make them happy. Stella (Renata Sorrah) realizes during her 50th wedding anniversary that she did not enjoy life as she should have and repeated the fate of her generation, she gave up dreams for marriage and motherhood. Lívia (Giovanna Antonelli), Stella's daughter, has her career, but suffers from not being in control of the emotional life she idealized. Cléo (Vanessa Giácomo) with her low self-esteem, needs to guarantee a roof and survival before thinking about any personal achievement. Meanwhile, Dora (Debora Ozório), Stella's granddaughter and Lívia's daughter, struggles between family role models and the feminism of today's young women. Stella makes an unexpected decision that changes the lives of everyone around her.

Cast

Main 
 Renata Sorrah as Stella Roman Fantini
 Giovanna Antonelli as Lívia Fantini Caldas
 Vanessa Giácomo as Cleópatra "Cléo" Ramos de Souza
 Dan Stulbach as Kléber Caldas
 Marcos Veras as Fábio Ferreira
 Débora Ozório as Dora Fantini Caldas
 Cacá Amaral as Ademar Lopes Fantini

Recurring 
 Analu Prestes as Maria José "Zezé" Ramos de Souza
 Erom Cordeiro as Júlio César Ramos de Souza
 Cecília Homem de Mello as Catarina Weinermann
 Jean Pierre Noher as Joaquim Benitez
 Juliano Lobreiro as Gui
 Nina Tomsic as Mari 
 Aldo Perrota as Luís Fernando
 Bia Guedes as Jurema

Guest 
 Fátima Bernardes as herself
 Marcella Rica as young Stella
 Stênio Garcia as Jurandir Sampaio
 Sílvia Salgado as Eleonora Sampaio
 Antônio Pedro as Belardo
 Thaíssa Carvalho as Babi
 Lorena Comparato as Suzana
 Milton Gonçalves as Gasparian
 Malu Valle as Maria Lúcia Junqueira

References

External links 
 Filhas de Eva on Globoplay
 

2020s Brazilian television series
2020s comedy-drama television series
2021 Brazilian television series debuts
Brazilian comedy television series
Brazilian drama television series
Globoplay original programming
Portuguese-language television shows